The 2003 Hessian state election was held on 2 February 2003 to elect the members of the Landtag of Hesse. The incumbent coalition government of the Christian Democratic Union (CDU) and Free Democratic Party (FDP) led by Minister-President Roland Koch was returned with an increased majority. The CDU recorded a 5.4% swing in its favour, winning an absolute majority of seats. It subsequently formed government alone, with Roland Koch continuing in office.

Parties
The table below lists parties represented in the previous Landtag of Hesse.

Opinion polling

Election result

|-
! colspan="2" | Party
! Votes
! %
! +/-
! Seats 
! +/-
! Seats %
|-
| bgcolor=| 
| align=left | Christian Democratic Union (CDU)
| align=right| 1,333,863
| align=right| 48.8
| align=right| 5.4
| align=right| 56
| align=right| 6
| align=right| 50.9
|-
| bgcolor=| 
| align=left | Social Democratic Party (SPD)
| align=right| 795,576
| align=right| 29.1
| align=right| 10.3
| align=right| 33
| align=right| 13
| align=right| 30.0
|-
| bgcolor=| 
| align=left | Alliance 90/The Greens (Grüne)
| align=right| 276,276
| align=right| 10.1
| align=right| 2.9
| align=right| 12
| align=right| 4
| align=right| 10.9
|-
| bgcolor=| 
| align=left | Free Democratic Party (FDP)
| align=right| 216,110
| align=right| 7.9
| align=right| 2.8
| align=right| 9
| align=right| 3
| align=right| 8.2
|-
! colspan=8|
|-
| bgcolor=|
| align=left | The Republicans (REP)
| align=right| 34,563
| align=right| 1.3
| align=right| 1.4
| align=right| 0
| align=right| ±0
| align=right| 0
|-
| bgcolor=|
| align=left | Others
| align=right| 78,604
| align=right| 2.9
| align=right| 
| align=right| 0
| align=right| ±0
| align=right| 0
|-
! align=right colspan=2| Total
! align=right| 2,734,992
! align=right| 100.0
! align=right| 
! align=right| 110
! align=right| ±0
! align=right| 
|-
! align=right colspan=2| Voter turnout
! align=right| 
! align=right| 64.6
! align=right| 1.8
! align=right| 
! align=right| 
! align=right| 
|}

Sources
 The Federal Returning Officer

2003
Hesse
February 2003 events in Europe